The USA South Athletic Conference (formerly the Dixie Intercollegiate Athletic Conference or the Dixie Conference) is an athletic conference which competes in the NCAA's Division III.  Member schools are located in North Carolina and Virginia.

History

The Dixie Intercollegiate Athletic Conference was founded in 1963 as a member of the National Association of Intercollegiate Athletics (NAIA) with the philosophy that participation would be strictly amateur, so no athletic financial aid or scholarships would be awarded by its affiliate institutions. The six charter members were Charlotte College, College of Charleston, Methodist College, North Carolina Wesleyan College, St. Andrews Presbyterian College, and Lynchburg College. In 1973, when the National Collegiate Athletic Association divided into a three-division format, the Dixie Conference left the NAIA and moved into the non-scholarship NCAA Division III.

On June 30, 2003, the conference changed to its name to the USA South Athletic Conference.

During the 2010–11 school year, changes to the membership of the USA South were announced. Three colleges announced plans to join the USA South Conference beginning in the 2012–13 season while one will depart the league. Piedmont College, LaGrange College, and Maryville College joined the Great South Athletic Conference on July 1, 2012.

Shenandoah University left the USA South on the above date, to become a full member of the Old Dominion Athletic Conference (ODAC), a league in which it held associate membership in several sports.

Christopher Newport University left the USA South after the 2012–2013 season to join the Capital Athletic Conference in all sports except for football which will remain a USA South affiliate member through the 2015 season.

On May 10, 2012, Covenant College and Huntingdon College announced plans to leave the Great South and join USA South Athletic Conference beginning in the 2013–2014 season.

On May 6, 2015, the USA South announced that Agnes Scott College, Salem College, and Wesleyan College would leave the Great South Athletic Conference and join the USA South beginning in the 2016–17 school year. The conference announced the future arrival of three more schools during the 2015–16 school year. First, it announced on December 9, 2015, that Brevard College, transitioning from the NCAA Division II South Atlantic Conference to Division III, would join for 2017–18 and beyond. Then, on May 4, 2016, two more incoming members were announced: Berea College, nearing completion of a transition from the NAIA to Division III, and Pfeiffer University, transitioning from the Division II Conference Carolinas to Division III. Both joined in 2017–18 as well.

On June 27, 2017, Ferrum College, a conference member since 1988, announced that it would leave for the Old Dominion Athletic Conference after the 2017–18 school year.

On December 11, 2019, the USA South announced the addition of Southern Virginia University who will join in the 2021–22 academic year.

Later changes to the USA South membership came on March 8, 2021, when Averett University revealed its intention to leave the USA South and join Ferrum College in the ODAC as a full member in the 2022–23 academic year, and on November 22, when Belhaven University, then a member of the American Southwest Conference, was at first accepted for membership in the conference also for 2022–23.

On February 18, 2022, the USA South Conference presidents announced a restructuring of the conference, resulting in all of its members outside North Carolina and Virginia—Agnes Scott, Berea, Covenant, Huntingdon, LaGrange, Maryville, Piedmont, and Wesleyan—leaving the USA South to form the new Collegiate Conference of the South (CCS) for the 2022-23 academic year. They were joined by incoming member Belhaven. CCS members sponsoring football, men's lacrosse, women's lacrosse, and women's golf remain in the USA South as associate members for those sports.

Chronological timeline
 1963 - The USA South was founded as the Dixie Intercollegiate Athletic Conference. It was a member of the National Association of Intercollegiate Athletics (NAIA). Charter members included Charlotte College (now the University of North Carolina at Charlotte), the College of Charleston, Lynchburg College (now the University of Lynchburg), Methodist College (now Methodist University), North Carolina Wesleyan College, and St. Andrews Presbyterian College (now St. Andrews University), effective beginning the 1963-64 academic year.
 1966 - Greensboro College joined the Dixie Conference, effective in the 1966-67 academic year.
 1968 - The University of North Carolina at Greensboro joined the Dixie Conference, effective in the 1968-69 academic year.
 1970
 UNC Charlotte and the College of Charleston left the Dixie Conference, effective after the 1969-70 academic year.
 Virginia Wesleyan College (now Virginia Wesleyan University) joined the Dixie Conference, effective in the 1970-71 academic year.
 1972 - Christopher Newport College (now Christopher Newport University) joined the Dixie Conference, effective in the 1972-73 academic year.
 1973 - The Dixie Conference left the NAIA to join the Division III ranks of the National Collegiate Athletic Association (NCAA), effective in the 1973-74 academic year.
 1976 - Lynchburg left the Dixie Conference to join the Old Dominion Athletic Conference (ODAC), effective after the 1975-76 academic year.
 1978 - Averett College (now Averett University) joined the Dixie Conference, effective in the 1978-79 academic year.
 1988
 UNC Greensboro and St. Andrews Presbyterian left the Dixie Conference, effective in the 1987-88 academic year.
 Ferrum College joined the Dixie Conference, effective in the 1988-89 academic year.
 1989 - Virginia Wesleyan left the Dixie Conference to join the ODAC, effective after the 1988-89 academic year.
 1992 - Shenandoah College (now Shenandoah University) joined the Dixie Conference, effective in the 1992-93 academic year.
 2000 - Chowan College (now Chowan University) joined the Dixie Conference, effective in the 2000-01 academic year.
 2003
 Peace College (now William Peace University) joined the Dixie Conference, effective in the 2003-04 academic year.
 The Dixie Conference was rebranded as the USA South Athletic Conference (USA South), effective in the 2003-04 academic year.
 2004 - Chowan left the USA South to join the NCAA Division II ranks as an NCAA D-II Independent, effective after the 2003-04 academic year. (Chowan would eventually join the Central Intercollegiate Athletic Association (CIAA) in 2009.)
 2005 - Maryville College joined the USA South as an associate member for football, effective in the 2005 fall season (2005-06 academic year).
 2007 - Mary Baldwin College (now Mary Baldwin University) and Meredith College joined the USA South, effective in the 2007-08 academic year.
 2009 - Agnes Scott College and LaGrange College joined the USA South as associate members for women's lacrosse, effective in the 2010 spring season (2009-10 academic year).
 2012
 Shenandoah left the USA South to join the ODAC, effective after the 2011-12 academic year.
 Piedmont College joined the USA South (with LaGrange and Maryville adding the rest of their sports for full member status), effective in the 2012-13 academic year.
 2013
 Christopher Newport left the USA South to join the Capital Athletic Conference (CAC), effective after the 2012-13 academic year.
 Covenant College and Huntingdon College joined the USA South, effective in the 2013-14 academic year.
 2014 - Agnes Scott left the USA South as an associate member for women's lacrosse, effective after the 2014 spring season (2013-14 academic year).
 2016
 Christopher Newport left the USA South as an associate member for football, effective after the 2015 fall season (2015-16 academic year).
 Salem College and Wesleyan College joined the USA South (with Agnes Scott re-joining, but for all sports), effective in the 2016-17 academic year.
 2017 - Berea College, Brevard College and Pfeiffer University joined the USA South, effective in the 2017-18 academic year.
 2018 - Ferrum left the USA South to join the ODAC, effective after the 2017-18 academic year.
 2021 - Southern Virginia University joined the USA South, effective in the 2021-22 academic year.
 2022
 In an amicable conference split, Agnes Scott, Berea, Covenant, Huntingdon, LaGrange, Maryville, Piedmont, and Wesleyan left the USA South at the end of the 2021–22 academic year to form the new Collegiate Conference of the South (CCS). With the CCS not sponsoring football, women's golf, or men's or women's lacrosse, all CCS members that sponsored those sports remained in the USA South as associate members.
 At the same time, Averett left the USA South to join the ODAC.
 Also at that time, Belhaven University joined the USA South as an associate member for football. Belhaven was initially slated to join for all sports, but was admitted to the CCS as a full member instead. The three other CCS members that sponsor football (Huntingdon, LaGrange, and Maryville) became USA South football associates. Huntingdon and non-football Piedmont also became associates in women's golf and men's and women's lacrosse; LaGrange also became an associate in men's lacrosse; and Maryville became an associate in women's golf.

Member schools

Current members
The USA South currently has 10 full members, all private schools, with Meredith as the league's only secular institution.

Notes

Associate members
The USA South has five associate members, all private and faith-based schools that are full CCS members. All became charter CCS members in the 2022 conference split. Belhaven had been announced as an incoming USA South member for 2022, but instead joined CCS.

Former members
The USA South has twenty former full members, all but four were private schools:

Notes

Membership timeline

Sports

The conference sponsors championships in the following sports:

Men's sponsored sports by school
Departing members are displayed in red.

Women's sponsored sports by school
Departing members are displayed in red.

Conference facilities

References

External links